is a historic city located in western Okayama Prefecture, Japan, sitting on the Takahashi River, on the coast of the Inland Sea. As of March 31, 2017, the city has an estimated population of 483,576 and a population density of 1,400 persons per km². The total area is 355.63 km².

History
The modern city of Kurashiki was founded on April 1, 1928. Previously, it was the site of clashes between the Taira and Minamoto clans during the Heian period. It gradually developed as a river port.  During the Edo period, it became an area directly controlled by the shogunate. Distinctive white-walled, black-tiled warehouses were built to store goods. During the Meiji Restoration (Japan's Industrial Revolution period), factories were built, including the Ohara Spinning Mill, which still stands as the nostalgic tourist attraction Ivy Square.

On August 1, 2005, the town of Mabi (from Kibi District), and the town of Funao (from Asakuchi District) were merged with Kurashiki.

Geography

Climate
Kurashiki has a humid subtropical climate (Köppen climate classification Cfa).

Demographics
Per Japanese census data, the population of Kurashiki in 2020 is 474,592 people. Kurashiki has been conducting censuses since 1960.

Attractions

Kurashiki is the home of Japan's first museum for Western art, the Ohara Museum of Art. Established in 1930 by Magosaburō Ōhara, it contains paintings by El Greco, Monet, Matisse, Gauguin, and Renoir. The collection also presents fine examples of Asian and contemporary art. The main building is designed in the style of Neoclassicism.

The old merchant quarter is called the Bikan historical area. It contains many fine examples of 17th century wooden warehouses (kura, 倉) painted white with traditional black tiles, along a canal framed with weeping willows and filled with koi. The area has no electric poles in order to make it more closely resemble the look of the Meiji period. One of the city's former town halls was located in the Kurashiki Kan, a European style building constructed in 1917.

In 1997 a theme park called Tivoli (after the park of the same name in Copenhagen) opened near Kurashiki Station. After ten years of operation it was closed in 2008, with a massive debt.

The Great Seto Bridge connects the city to Sakaide in Kagawa Prefecture across the Inland Sea.

Kenzo Tange, winner of the 1987 Pritzker Prize for architecture, designed the former Kurashiki City Hall in 1960.

Education

Colleges and universities
The city is home to several private universities and one public university.
 Kurashiki University of Science and the Arts
 Kurashiki Sakuyo University
 Kawasaki College of Allied Health Professions
 Kurashiki City College (public)
 Okayama College
 Kawasaki University of Medical Welfare
 Kawasaki Medical School
 Kawasaki Medical University

Primary and secondary schools

The city has a North Korean school, .

Sports
Kurashiki has a variety of sports clubs, including former Japan Football League side Mitsubishi Mizushima.
Mitsubishi Motors Mizushima FC - Soccer
JX Nippon Oil & Energy Mizushima F.C. - Soccer
Kurashiki Oceans - Baseball
Kurashiki Peach Jacks - Baseball

Kurashiki was also the place where current J. League sides Vissel Kobe and Fagiano Okayama had their origins before moving.

Sister and friendship cities
Kurashiki maintains the following sister and friendship cities:
  Sankt Pölten, Austria, September 29, 1957
  Kansas City, Missouri, United States since May 28, 1972
  Christchurch, New Zealand, March 7, 1973
  Zhenjiang, Jiangsu, China, November 18, 1997

Notable people
 Ahn Young-Hak, Japanese-born North Korean football midfielder
 Umekichi Hiyama , Japanese female  folk rhyme master belonging to the Rakugo Arts Association
 Senichi Hoshino, baseball player
 Keitarou Izawa, a.k.a. Ichiyo Izawa, pianist, frontman of Appa, and former member of Tokyo Jihen
 Mikio Kariyama, professional shogi player
 Kibi no Makibi, scholar and noble during the Nara period
 Magosaburō Ōhara, businessman and philanthropist
 Yasuharu Ōyama, shogi player, the 15th Lifetime Meijin
 Daisuke Takahashi, figure skater
 Joichiro Tatsuyoshi, boxer
 Isamu Nagato, actor
 Makiko Ohmoto, voice actress
 Keiji Tanaka, figure skater
 Hisako Kanemoto, voice actress

References

External links

  
 Kurashiki City Tourists official website 
 Ryokan Kurashiki website 
 Kurashiki's Sister/Friendship Cities

 
Cities in Okayama Prefecture